The 1st Legislative Assembly of British Columbia sat from 1871 to 1875. The members were elected in the British Columbia general election held in October 1871. John Foster McCreight was called upon to form a cabinet. In December 1872, the government was defeated on a confidence motion and Amor De Cosmos subsequently formed a new cabinet. After De Cosmos was elected to the House of Commons in February 1874, George A. Walken became premier.

There were four sessions of the 1st Legislature:

James Trimble served as speaker.

Members of the 1st General Assembly 
The following members were elected to the assembly in 1871:

By-elections 
By-elections were held for the following members appointed to the provincial cabinet, as was required at the time. All cabinet members were re-elected by acclamation:

A. Rocke Robertson, Provincial Secretary, acclaimed November 28, 1871
Henry Holbrook, Chief Commissioner of Lands and Works, acclaimed November 28, 1871
George A. Walkem, Minister of Finance, acclaimed February 23, 1872
John Ash, Provincial Secretary, acclaimed January 11, 1873
Robert Beaven, Chief Commissioner of Lands and Works, acclaimed January 6, 1873
William Armstrong, Minister of Finance and Agriculture, acclaimed March 21, 1873

By-elections were held to replace members for various other reasons:

References

Political history of British Columbia
Terms of British Columbia Parliaments
1871 establishments in British Columbia
1875 disestablishments in British Columbia